Jackson Township is an inactive township in Jasper County, in the U.S. state of Missouri.

Jackson Township has the name of President Andrew Jackson.

References

Townships in Missouri
Townships in Jasper County, Missouri